The following is a list of Sites of Special Scientific Interest in the Renfrew and Cunninghame  Area of Search. For other areas, see List of SSSIs by Area of Search.

 Àrd Bheinn
 Ardrossan to Saltcoats Coast
 Arran Moors
 Arran Northern Mountains
 Ashgrove Loch
 Ballochmartin Bay
 Bankhead Moss, Beith
 Barmufflock Dam
 Benlister Glen
 Black Cart SSSI
 Bogside Flats
 Boylestone Quarry
 Brother and Little Lochs
 Cart and Kittoch Valleys
 Castle Semple and Barr Lochs
 Clauchlands Point - Corrygills
 Clochodrick Stone
 Cockinhead Moss
 Corrie Foreshore and Limestone Mines
 Dargavel Burn
 Dippin Head
 Drumadoon-Tormore
 Dundonald Burn
 Dunrod Hill
 Dykeneuk Moss
 Formakin
 Gleann Dubh
 Glen Moss SSSI
 High Smithstone Quarry  De-notified (confirmed) on 16 April 2012
 Inner Clyde
 Kames Bay
 Knocknairs Hill
 Laggan SSSI
 Largs Coast Section
 Loch Libo
 Lynn Spout
 Muirkirk Uplands
 North Newton Shore
 Portencross Coast
 Renfrewshire Heights
 Rouken Glen
 Shielhill Glen
 Shovelboard
 Skelmorlie Glen
 South Coast of Arran
 Trearne Quarry
 Waulkmill Glen
 Western Gailes

 
Renfrew and Cunninghame